Shahrak-e Taleqani may refer to:
 Shahrak-e Taleqani, Alborz
 Shahrak-e Taleqani, Fars
 Shahrak-e Taleqani, Andika, Khuzestan Province
 Shahrak-e Taleqani, Bavi, Khuzestan Province
 Shahrak-e Taleqani, Behbahan, Khuzestan Province
 Shahrak-e Taleqani, Izeh, Khuzestan Province
 Shahrak-e Taleqani, Mahshahr, Khuzestan Province